Diego Gallego Arnáiz (born 9 June 1982 in Burgos) is a Spanish former road cyclist.

Major results

2004
 8th Overall Volta a Lleida
2005
 2nd Overall Circuito Montañes
1st Stage 6
 2nd Overall Vuelta Ciclista a León
 7th Clásica Memorial Txuma
2006
 4th Overall Circuito Montañes
 5th Overall Vuelta a Navarra
2007
 1st Stage 5 Cinturón a Mallorca
 4th Overall Tour des Pyrénées
 9th Overall Vuelta a Extremadura
2008
 3rd Clásica a los Puertos
2010
 9th GP Llodio

References

External links

1982 births
Living people
Spanish male cyclists
Sportspeople from Burgos
Cyclists from Castile and León